= Macho ya Mji =

Kenyan comic

Macho ya Mji ("City Eyes" in Swahili) is a Kenyan comic by Ruth Wairimu Karani and Kham.

The comic, first published on 26 March 1998 by Sasa Sema Publications, stars two boys and a blind beggar in Nairobi. The group tries to stop crimes and assist the police. The comic includes Swahili proverbs (methali) written in contemporary Kenyan slang.
